This article contains a list of fossil-bearing stratigraphic units in the state of Tennessee, U.S.

Sites

See also

 Paleontology in Tennessee

References

 

Tennessee
Stratigraphic units
Stratigraphy of Tennessee
Tennessee geography-related lists
United States geology-related lists